Carlos Valcárcel Díaz (born October 25, 1981 in San Juan) is a boxer from Puerto Rico, who represented his native country at the 2000 Summer Olympics in Sydney, Australia. He won the silver medal in the men's flyweight division (– 51 kg) at the 2002 Central American and Caribbean Games in El Salvador. Valcarcel made his professional debut on 2004-05-25.

On June 8, 2012, Valcarcel fought Jesse Magdaleno on ESPN Friday Night Fights at Las Vegas, Nevada. He lost by a first-round knockout.

His professional boxing record stands at 12 wins, 5 losses and 4 draws (ties), 5 wins by knockout.

Varcarcel is a resident of the city of Catano.

References
 
 

1981 births
Living people
Flyweight boxers
Boxers at the 2000 Summer Olympics
Boxers at the 2003 Pan American Games
Olympic boxers of Puerto Rico
Sportspeople from San Juan, Puerto Rico
Puerto Rican male boxers
Central American and Caribbean Games silver medalists for Puerto Rico
Competitors at the 2002 Central American and Caribbean Games
Central American and Caribbean Games medalists in boxing
Pan American Games competitors for Puerto Rico